Richard Gordon Thomson (born 16 June 1976) is a Scottish politician. He is a member of the Scottish National Party (SNP) He has been the Member of Parliament (MP) for Gordon since the 2019 general election, having previously the leader of the SNP group on Aberdeenshire Council. He has been serving as SNP Spokesperson for International Trade since 2022, and SNP Spokesperson for Wales and Northern Ireland since 2021.

Early life and education
Thomson was born in Edinburgh in 1976, the son of Alexander and Ethel Thomson.

He was educated at Tynecastle High School, Edinburgh, before going to the University of Stirling to study History and Politics. He gained a BA (Hons) in 1998. He is presently studying part-time for an MBA from the Edinburgh Business School at Heriot-Watt University.

Career
He worked for Scottish Widows in Edinburgh from 1999 to 2004, firstly as an Assistant Manager in their Customer Relations Department, and latterly as an Account Manager in Corporate Pensions.

He contributed a chapter exploring the 'social democratisation of the SNP' to a book on post-devolution politics called Breaking Up Britain – Four Nations After a Union, published in 2009 by Lawrence & Wishart.

In August 2009, he was one of the three speakers in London at the What are the implications of Scottish Independence – for England? event hosted by the SNP, that discussed implications for England in areas such as defence, taxation, the role of the Monarchy, and possible political re-alignments.

He formerly wrote for the Ellon Times and the Inverurie Herald. Thomson was a reporter and columnist for Angus Company Press from 2011 to 2012. Since 2017, he has been Deputy Editor of The Scottish Independent newspaper.

Political career 
In 2001, he unsuccessfully contested the Tweeddale, Ettrick and Lauderdale constituency, a safe seat for the Liberal Democrats in which Thomson came fourth with 4,108 votes (12.4%). Thomson was former Head of Campaigns for the Scottish National Party from 2004 to 2005, and the party's Westminster Head of Research, before returning to Aberdeenshire in the summer of 2008 to work for First Minister Alex Salmond. Thomson was Parliamentary Assistant to Salmond from 2008 to 2011.

He worked as a senior researcher to MSP Shona Robison and MP Stewart Hosie from 2000 to 2007. In 2010, he stood in Gordon: the Liberal Democrat Malcolm Bruce retained his seat, but Thomson took the SNP into second place.

Thomson was on Aberdeenshire Council from 2012 to 2020. He was leader of Aberdeenshire Council from June 2015 until May 2017, and Opposition Leader from 2017 to 2020. He represented the council on the North Sea Commission, where he was vice-chair of the Marine Resources Group.

He was selected to contest the Gordon constituency for the second time at the 2019 general election. During the campaign he claimed, "A vote for me.. is not a vote for Scottish independence and I will never, ever, try and claim it as such." He narrowly won the seat from the Conservative incumbent Colin Clark, with a slim majority of 819 votes (1.4%).

In March 2020, Thomson resigned from Aberdeenshire Council to "concentrate 100% on being the MP for the Gordon Constituency".

Personal life 
Thomson lives in Ellon, Aberdeenshire. His partner is Eilidh Mackechnie; the couple have two daughters.

References

External links

An ever closer sovereignty? - The SNP referendum strategy allows Scottish Labour supporters to vote for independence, taking the idea out of the abstract

1976 births
Living people
Scottish National Party councillors
UK MPs 2019–present
Scottish National Party MPs
Alumni of the University of Stirling
Alumni of Heriot-Watt University
Councillors in Aberdeenshire
Leaders of local authorities of Scotland
Scottish journalists
People educated at Tynecastle High School